Ashwaroodan is a 2006 Indian Malayalam-language action drama film directed by Jayaraj and produced by D. Ramanaidu under the company Suresh Productions. The film stars Suresh Gopi, Padmapriya, Sai Kumar and Jagannatha Varma. The film features songs composed by Jassie Gift and background score by M. M. Srilekha.

Plot

Poomadathil Vishwanathan a compassionate landlord lives with his wife and son, Veerabhadran, and is accorded a status of being the main arbitrator in the village. He disposes cases presented before him in a first-come serve basis without differentiating between right and wrong. 
Vishwanathan is embroiled in a legal dispute regarding the possession of a vast area of land with his brothers in law, the Mangoyikkal Kurups. The court rules in favour of Vishwanathan. Vishwanathan's cunning advocate Kanaran join hands with the Kurups and advises them the steps to retrieve the Mala in exchange of half of the Mala.

The next day, Vishwanathan is tricked into meeting the Kurups to mediate a dispute. Vishwanathan is killed by Kanaran with an ivory tusk and it is manipulated as a death caused by an elephant. Veerabhadran takes over the reins of his family and village. In the present time, the Mala is under the possession of Kurups - falsified as a property transfer done by Vishwanathan before his death. Over the period of time, there are many inhabitants living in the Mala.

Cast
Suresh Gopi as Veerabhadran
Padmapriya as Seetha Lakshmi
Sai Kumar as Marthandan
Jagannatha Varma
Saiju Kurup
 Ranjith Velayudhan
 Padma Kumar
 Kaladharan
Babu Annur
T. G. Ravi as Kanaran Panicker
Captain Raju as Viswanathan
M. B. Padmakumar as Seetha Lakshmi's brother

References

External links
 
 

2006 films
2006 action drama films
2000s Malayalam-language films
Suresh Productions films
Films directed by Jayaraj